Joseph Michael Erautt (September 1, 1921 – October 6, 1976) was a Canadian-born professional baseball player.

Education and career 
Born in Vibank, Saskatchewan, and of German descent, he was the elder brother of MLB pitcher Eddie Erautt. The Erautt family moved to Portland, Oregon, before Eddie was born, hence the younger sibling was a native American citizen.

Joe Erautt was an alumnus of the University of Portland. He served in the United States Army Air Forces in the Pacific Theater during World War II. His war-interrupted professional career extended for 14 total seasons (1940–42; 1946–56) and included almost 1,100 games played in minor league baseball.

His MLB service consisted of two 16-game stints with the White Sox. For his career, he collected eight hits, including one double, and compiled a .186 batting average in 43 at-bats, with one run batted in.

References

External links

1921 births
1976 deaths
Baseball people from Saskatchewan
Beaumont Exporters players
Birmingham Barons players
Buffalo Bisons (minor league) players
Burials at Willamette National Cemetery
Canadian emigrants to the United States
Chicago White Sox players
Columbus Jets players
Deaths from Parkinson's disease
Neurological disease deaths in Oregon
Henderson Oilers players
Little Rock Travelers players
Major League Baseball catchers
Major League Baseball players from Canada
New Orleans Pelicans (baseball) players
People from Vibank, Saskatchewan
Portland Pilots baseball players
Schenectady Blue Jays players
Seattle Rainiers players
Baseball players from Portland, Oregon
Syracuse Chiefs players
Toronto Maple Leafs (International League) players
United States Army Air Forces personnel of World War II
University of Portland alumni
Winston-Salem Twins players